Uyarsky District is an administrative and municipal district (raion), one of the forty-three in Krasnoyarsk Krai, Russia. It is located in the south of the krai and borders with Sukhobuzimsky District in the north, Rybinsky District in the east, Partizansky District in the south, Mansky District in the west, and with Beryozovsky District in the northwest. Its administrative center is the town of Uyar. Population:  24,559 (2002 Census);  The population of Uyar accounts for 57.7% of the district's total population.

History
The district was founded on April 4, 1924.

Divisions and government
As of 2013, he acting Head of the district is Natalya A. Soboleva and the Chairman of the District Council is Vladimir N. Solomatov.

References

Notes

Sources

Districts of Krasnoyarsk Krai
States and territories established in 1924